Carpignano may refer to some places in Italy:

Carpignano (Grottaminarda), a hamlet of Grottaminarda (AV), Campania
Carpignano (San Severino Marche), a hamlet of San Severino Marche (MC), Marche
Carpignano Salentino, a municipality of the Province of Lecce, Apulia
Carpignano Sesia, a municipality of the Province of Novara, Piedmont
Cura Carpignano, a municipality of the Province of Pavia, Lombardy